The Center for Advanced Studies on Puerto Rico and the Caribbean (Spanish: Centro de Estudios Avanzados de Puerto Rico y El Caribe) is a private institute housed in the former San Ildefonso Conciliar Seminary in Old San Juan, San Juan, Puerto Rico that offers graduate studies in arts and philosophy. It was incorporated on February 28, 1968, by Pablo Casals, Luis Muñoz Marín, Roberto Busó Carrasquillo, and Jaime Benítez. However, it remained inactive and without organization until 1976, when Ricardo Alegría made a request before the Council on Higher Education of Puerto Rico to transform the center into an academic institution.

The center is currently accredited by the Middle States Association of Colleges and Schools and it publishes La Revista del Centro de Estudios Avanzados de Puerto Rico y el Caribe.

Notable members

 Enrique Laguerre - emeritus member.
 Ricardo Alegría - considered the founding father.
Camille Lizarríbar-Yale University Dean of Student Affairs.

Notable alumni 

 Soraya Aracena - anthropologist and curator
 María Colom Silva-(MA '92) Director of the Municipal Archive of Mayagüez.
 Cristina M. Miranda Palacios-Executive Founding Director of the Puerto Rican Cities League. 
 Abel Nazario-former mayor of Yauco.
 Carlos Antonio Otero-Chief of Information at El Vocero.

References

External links
 Official website
 Official Facebook page

Universities and colleges in Puerto Rico
Educational institutions established in 1968
Caribbean studies